Wooller is a surname. Notable people with the surname include:

 Robert Wooller (1817–?), English cricketer
 Wilf Wooller (1912–1997), Welsh cricketer and rugby player
 Fred Wooller (born 1938), Australian rules footballer
 Jeff Wooller (born 1940), English accountant
 Geraldine Wooller (born 1941), Australian novelist
 Lukas Wooller, English songwriter, record producer, and musician

See also
 Wooler (name)